West Nicholson or Tshabezi is a town in the Matabeleland South Province of Zimbabwe.

Location
The geographical coordinates of the town are: 21°03'52.0"S, 29°21'54.0"E (Latitude:-21.064444; Longitude:29.365000).

Overview
West Nicholson is named after Andy Nicholson, an early prospector who entered the country with the Pioneer Column and was responsible for mining exploration in the area.

The town hosted a large beef factory, that turned the local cattle into corned beef and biltong, but this is now closed. There is a supermarket and butchery run by Rogers Brothers and Sons. Game and Safari activities are available at Tshabezi Safaris, Tamba, Sondelani and Tod's Guest House. Once a major gold mining area, the country around West Nicholson is riddled with small workings, the only major mining activity still occurs about four kilometers along the main road towards Bulawayo. The mine is called Jessie Mine owned by F.A. Stewart Private Limited.

The Mzingwane River runs through the town and a railway runs past it, carrying passengers and cargo.

Population
According to the 1982 population census, West Nicholson had a population of 1,633.

Sports
Sporting activities are mainly based on soccer, having two teams namely, Jessie Mine Football Club and West Nicholson United playing in the Zimbabwe Football Association's lower division leagues. Other sporting activities include netball and volleyball with Jessie Mine and JZ Moyo High School taking part in the Matabeleland South Volleyball Association's leagues.

Education
The local primary school, West Nicholson Primary School, is located close to downtown and is run by the Lutheran Church.
JZ Moyo High School (Jason Ziyaphapha Moyo High School), is a government high school, for both girls and boys, that was established in 1982. JZ Moyo High School is part of the ZIMFEP group of schools.

References

External links
 Leibigs meat factory: Former employees living in abject poverty As of June 2020.

Gwanda District
Populated places in Matabeleland South Province